Expedition 62 was the 62nd long duration mission to the International Space Station, which began 5:50 UTC on 6 February 2020 with the undocking of the Soyuz MS-13 spacecraft. The Expedition consisted of Russian commander Oleg Skripochka, as well as American flight engineers Jessica Meir and Andrew Morgan. The second part of Expedition 62 was made up of the three crew members from Soyuz MS-16.

Crew

Crew notes
Soyuz MS-16 was originally meant to transport the Expedition 63/64 crew to the ISS, carrying Tikhonov, Babkin and Japanese astronaut Akihiko Hoshide to the ISS. On 31 October 2019 it was announced that NASA astronaut Chris Cassidy would fly the mission instead of Hoshide, in order to make sure an American astronaut was on board the station at all times, in the face of delays with the Commercial Crew Program. These changes also meant that Soyuz MS-16's crew would make up part of Expedition 62. The Expedition also marked the first time the Russian segment of the ISS has had three crew members since Expedition 50, and was one of the shortest expeditions in the program, at just over two months long.

Patch design notes
In February 2019, graphic designer and art director Jessie Bowers (Cypha) designed the Expedition 62 patch.

References 

Expeditions to the International Space Station
2020 in spaceflight